van Miltenburg is a surname. Notable people with the surname include:

Anouchka van Miltenburg (born 1967), Dutch politician and journalist
James Cornelius van Miltenburg (1909–1966), Pakistani Roman Catholic archbishop
Matthijs van Miltenburg (born 1972), Dutch politician
Peter Van Miltenburg (born 1957), Australian sprinter

Surnames of Dutch origin